Manuel Fortuna (born March 23, 1985) is a Dominican basketball player for Leones de Santo Domingo and the Dominican national team, where he participated at the 2014 FIBA Basketball World Cup.

References

1985 births
Living people
Dominican Republic men's basketball players
Point guards
Basketball players at the 2015 Pan American Games
Shooting guards
Pan American Games competitors for the Dominican Republic
2014 FIBA Basketball World Cup players